Gert Sabidussi (born 28 October 1929 in Graz- april 2022) is an Austrian mathematician specializing in combinatorics and graph theory.

Biography 
Sabidussi was born in Graz, Austria.  His family later moved to Innsbruck where his father was a Protestant deacon. He graduated from the University of Vienna, where he attended lectured by Felix Ehrenhaft, Nikolaus Hofreiter, Johann Radon and Hans Thirring.  In 1953, he defended his doctorate on 0-1 matrices under the supervision of Edmund Hlawka and received a two-year fellowship at Princeton University.  He was then an Instructor at University of Minnesota in Minneapolis, but because of the heavy teaching load moved a year later, in 1956, to Tulane University in New Orleans.  He moved to Montreal in 1963, and was instrumental in bringing to Canada a number of combinatorialists and graph theorists, including Anton Kotzig, and Jaroslav Nešetřil who wrote a thesis under Sabidussi.  He first worked at McMaster University and then at University of Montreal.  Over the years, he had 13 graduate students.  His 60th, 70th and 80th birthdays were celebrated with large Graph Theory birthday conferences.

Mathematical work
Sabidussi wrote foundational work on Cayley graphs, graph products and Frucht's theorem.

References 
 Sabidussi's Biography  (in German)

External links 
 Gert Sabidussi Web Page at Université de Montréal.

 Algebraic Graph Theory 2009, a Conference in celebration of Gert Sabidussi's 80th birthday.

1929 births
Scientists from Graz
Living people
20th-century  Austrian mathematicians
21st-century Canadian mathematicians
Graph theorists
Academic staff of the Université de Montréal
University of Vienna alumni
Austrian emigrants to Canada